Events in the year 1910 in Spain.

Incumbents
Monarch: Alfonso XIII
Prime Minister: Segismundo Moret (until February); José Canalejas (from February)

Events
22 May - A general election results in the Liberal Party, under incumbent prime minister Canalejas, being returned to power.
20 August - Crime of Cuenca: The disappearance of José María Grimaldos López leads to the arrest and imprisonment of two men. Grimaldos turns up, alive, in 1926.

Births
4 June - Carmen de Gurtubay, noblewoman (died 1959)
10 November - Tomás Blanco, film actor (died 1990)

Deaths

References

 
Years of the 20th century in Spain
Spain
Spain